Cobar was an electoral district of the Legislative Assembly in the Australian state of New South Wales which was named after the town of Cobar. It was first created in 1894 and abolished in 1920. Cobar was recreated in 1930 and abolished in 1968.

History
Prior to 1894 the town of Cobar was part of the district of Bourke which returned three members. Multi-member constituencies were abolished in the 1893 redistribution, resulting in the creation of 76 new districts, including Cobar. Bourke was reduced in size and parts were given to the new districts of Cobar and The Barwon. Cobar also absorbed parts of  the abolished districts of The Bogan and Forbes. The electoral district included all of the counties of Canbelego, Robinson and Yanda as well as parts of the surrounding counties of Booroondarra, Cowper, Flinders, Gregory, Oxley, Rankin, Werunda and Woore. Cobar's economy was centered around copper mining, and the district also included Nyngan which was established in 1883 as a stop on the Main Western railway line on its way to Bourke.

At its establishment in 1894 Cobar had 1,646 enrolled voters, slightly less than the average of 2,046. In 1904 the number of enrolled voters nearly doubled as women were given the right to vote while the number of members of the Legislative Assembly was reduced from 125 to 90 as a result of the 1903 New South Wales referendum. Cobar absorbed parts of The Lachlan and parts of the abolished seats of The Barwon, Condoublin and Wilcannia. The combined effect of the changes meant that the number of enrolled voters in Cobar went from 3,501, to 6,488, an increase of 185%. The district was significantly expanded in 1913, absorbing most of The Darling, including the town of Bourke.

Cobar was abolished in 1920, with the introduction of proportional representation, and was absorbed by the expanded district of Sturt, along with Willyama to create a three-member electorate covering most of the Western Division of New South Wales. Proportional representation was abolished in 1927, with Bourke going to the re-created district of Namoi, while Cobar and Nyngan were in the re-created district of Lachlan.

Cobar was re-created in 1930, and comprised part of the districts of Sturt, Lachlan and Namoi, including the towns of Cobar, Bourke, Brewarrina, Byrock, Wilcannia, White Cliffs and part of Broken Hill.

The 1949 redistribution saw Cobar absorb the entire district of Sturt, but lost Bourke and Nyngan to Castlereagh and South Broken Hill and Menindee to the re-constituted Sturt.

Cobar, along with Sturt were abolished as a result of the 1966 redistribution, replaced by the new district of Broken Hill, which included all of the town, and the district extended from the border with Victoria on the Murray River to the Queensland border in the north, including the towns of Wentworth and Wilcannia. The town of Cobar was absorbed by Castlereagh, which moved west, while south western part of the district was absorbed by the district of Temora.

Members for Cobar

Election results

Notes

References

Former electoral districts of New South Wales
Constituencies established in 1894
Constituencies disestablished in 1920
Constituencies established in 1930
Constituencies disestablished in 1968
1894 establishments in Australia
1920 disestablishments in Australia
1930 establishments in Australia
1968 disestablishments in Australia